Voices is the sixth album by English singer-songwriter Claire Hamill, released in 1986. The title refers to the fact that the album's mostly-instrumental music is entirely a capella, created by sampling and multi-tracking Hamill's voice.

Track listing 
All songs written by Claire Hamill.
 "Awaken...Larkrise" - 3.59
 "Tides" - 4:34
 "Moss" - 3:08
 "Afternoon in a Wheatfield" - 5:04
 "Stars" - 2.58
 "Leaf Fall" - 4:32
 "Mist on the Ridge" - 4:19
 "Harvest" - 3:29
 "Icicle Rain" - 5:10
 "Sleep" - 4:49

Personnel 
Claire Hamill - guitar, keyboards, vocals, samples, loops, production

References

External links
Claire Hamill's website

Claire Hamill albums
1986 albums